The 2003–04 New Zealand V8 season (the leading motorsport category in New Zealand) consisted of seven rounds beginning on 7–9 November 2003 and ending 27–38 March 2004. The championship was won by Andy Booth, for the first time in his career.

Calendar

Points structure
Points for the 2003/2004 championship are allocated as follows:

Results

References

NZ Touring Cars Championship seasons
V8 season
V8 season